Wallpaper is material used to cover and decorate interior walls. 

Wallpaper may also refer to:

 Wallpaper (musician), also known as Ricky Reed
 Wallpaper, a 2018 Canadian children's book by Thao Lam
 Wallpaper (computing), a background picture on computer screens
 Wallpaper (magazine) (since 1996), a cultural magazine
 Wallpaper group, a two-dimensional repeated pattern analysis
 Operation Wallpaper, a 1985 South African Defense Force military operation

See also
 Stealth wallpaper, signal-shielding wallpaper to prevent electronic eavesdropping
 Wallpaper effect, a stereoscopic illusion in which wallpaper acts as an autostereogram